The 2008 Southern Miss Golden Eagles football team represented the University of Southern Mississippi in the 2008 NCAA Division I FBS football season. The Golden Eagles were led by first-year head coach Larry Fedora and played their home games at M. M. Roberts Stadium. They are a member of the East Division of Conference USA. They finished the season 7–6, 4–4 in C-USA play. They were invited to the New Orleans Bowl where they defeated Troy, 30–27.

Schedule

References

Southern Miss
Southern Miss Golden Eagles football seasons
New Orleans Bowl champion seasons
Southern Miss Golden Eagles football